Billie Jean, Look at Me is a South Korean television series that aired from December 26, 2006 to February 6, 2007 on MBC.

Plot
Yoo Bang-hee's (Park Hee-von) Prince Charming is teen idol Choi Hye-Seong (Lee Ji-hoon), not exactly the most approachable person. Turning her one-sided love into near stalking, Bang-Hee ends up ruining Hye-Seong's young career by revealing information she shouldn't have to the public. Eight years pass by, and Hye-Seong is still suffering from that failure, roaming the streets aimlessly when a familiar face suddenly appears. Bang-Hee, now an assistant writer for a Star Making Project, promises she'll make up for all her mistakes by making Hye-Seong a star.

Cast
Lee Ji-hoon as Choi Hye-sung
Park Hee-von as Yoo Bang-hee
Park Tam-hee as Wie Soo-kyung
Lee Da-jin as Jang Ji-young
Kim Il-woo as Uncle
Kim Jae-seung

See also
Billie Jean, Look At Me OST

2006 South Korean television series debuts
2007 South Korean television series endings
Korean-language television shows
MBC TV television dramas
South Korean musical television series